The Jervey Athletic Center is a building in Clemson, South Carolina, on the campus of Clemson University.  It contains the gymnasium for the volleyball team and offices and training facilities for all of Clemson's athletic teams.  The facility was built in 1973 and renovated in 1995.

References

External links

Clemson Tigers sports venues
College volleyball venues in the United States
Sports venues completed in 1973